Licked Live in NYC is a live album by English rock band the Rolling Stones. It was recorded on 18 January 2002 on the Licks Tour in support of their 40th anniversary compilation album Forty Licks. The tour grossed over $300 million, becoming the second highest grossing tour at that time, behind their own Voodoo Lounge Tour of 1994–1995.

The concert was originally broadcast live on American pay television network HBO and featured an appearance by Sheryl Crow on "Honky Tonk Women".

Licked Live in NYC was released as Blu-ray and DVD video, as well as audio-only on 2-CD, 3-LP white vinyl or digital download.

Track listing

Personnel
The Rolling Stones
 Mick Jagger – lead vocals, guitars, harmonica
 Keith Richards – vocals, guitars
 Ronnie Wood – guitars
 Charlie Watts – drums

Additional personnel
 Darryl Jones – bass guitar, backing vocals
 Matt Clifford – keyboards, French horn
 Chuck Leavell – keyboards, backing vocals 
 Bobby Keys – saxophone
 Bernard Fowler – backing vocals
 Lisa Fischer – backing vocals
 Blondie Chaplin – backing vocals, acoustic guitar, percussion
 Tim Ries – saxophone, keyboards 
 Kent Smith – trumpet 
 Michael Davis – trombone

Charts

References

2022 live albums
The Rolling Stones live albums
Events in New York City